Owasco River (also known as Owasco Creek, Owasco Lake Outlet, and Owasco Outlet) is a river in Cayuga County in the state of New York. The river drains Owasco Lake at Auburn and flows in a north-northwest direction before converging with the Seneca River north-northwest of Port Byron. The Owasco River Railway is named after the river.

The city of Auburn owns and operates a dam on the river, and empties the effluent from its wastewater treatment plant into the river.

Hydrology
The United States Geological Survey (USGS) maintains one stream gauge along the Owasco River.

References

Rivers of New York (state)
Rivers of Cayuga County, New York